"Boogie Woogie Fiddle Country Blues" is a song written and recorded by the Charlie Daniels Band. It was released in August 1988 as the first single from the album Homesick Heroes.  The song reached number 10 on the Billboard Hot Country Singles & Tracks chart.

Chart performance

References

External links
 

1988 singles
Charlie Daniels songs
Songs written by Charlie Daniels
Song recordings produced by James Stroud
Epic Records singles
1988 songs